Tommy Maistrello (born 24 June 1993) is an Italian professional footballer who plays as a forward for  club Cittadella.

Club career
Maistrello made his senior debut for Eccellenza club Abano at 17 years old. Then, he joined to Bassano youth system.

He made his professional debut on 23 September 2012 for Serie C2 against Castiglione.

On 2 July 2021, he joined Renate on a permanent deal, after one season on loan in the club.

On 9 January 2023, Maistrello joined  side Cittadella on a permanent deal.

References

External links
 
 

1993 births
Living people
People from Correggio, Emilia-Romagna
Footballers from Emilia-Romagna
Italian footballers
Association football forwards
Serie B players
Serie C players
Eccellenza players
Abano Calcio players
Bassano Virtus 55 S.T. players
Ravenna F.C. players
L.R. Vicenza players
S.S. Monopoli 1966 players
Fermana F.C. players
A.C. Renate players
A.S. Cittadella players
Sportspeople from the Province of Reggio Emilia